"Te Quiero" (English: "I Want You") is the debut single by Panamanian singer Flex from his debut studio album Te Quiero: Romantic Style in da World released on September 28, 2007. In 2008, the number serves as main-theme of Mexican telenovela Central de Abastos. It won the Billboard Latin Music Award for Latin Rhythm Airplay Song of the Year in 2009.

Music video
A music video for the song was directed by Conrado Martínez. It was filmed in Mexico City on September 7 and released on September 10, 2007.

Chart performance
The song topped the Billboard Hot Latin Tracks, Latin Tropical Airplay and Latin Rhythm Airplay charts in the United States and charts in Mexico. It also charted on the Billboard Hot 100 at number 86, becoming Flex's most successful single to date. "Te Quiero" ranked fourth at the Hot Latin Songs twenty-fifth anniversary chart.

Charts

Weekly charts

All-time charts

Certifications

Remix

An acoustic and Spanglish version with singer Belinda were recorded for the fan edition of Te Quiero: Romantic Style in da World, the Spanglish version was released as the fourth and final single from the album on May 13, 2009. A music video features Belinda was also released as part of promotion of the single. The song was well received on radio stations from Mexico.

Other remixes
A remix with singer Arcángel and another with Thiaguinho were recorded but not included on any edition of the album.

Track listing
Maxi single
"Te Quiero" – 3:16
"Te Quiero" (Spanglish Version) (featuring Belinda) – 3:23
"Te Quiero" (Acoustic Version) (featuring Belinda) – 2:48

See also
 List of number-one singles of 2007 (Spain)
 List of number-one songs of 2007 (Mexico)
 List of number-one Billboard Hot Latin Songs of 2008

References

External links

2007 songs
2007 debut singles
2008 singles
Belinda Peregrín songs
Flex (singer) songs
Latin Grammy Award for Best Urban Song
Monitor Latino Top General number-one singles
Number-one singles in Spain
Songs written by Flex (singer)
EMI Televisa Music singles